Adoxophyes moderatana is a species of moth of the family Tortricidae. It is found in India (the Andaman Islands), Borneo, New Guinea and the Solomon Islands.

The larvae feed on the leaves of Paraserianthus falcateria.

References

Moths described in 1863
Adoxophyes
Moths of Oceania
Moths of Asia